Hayley Crawford (born 27 March 1984) is an Australian soccer player who played as a midfielder for Newcastle Jets and Canberra United in the W-League and for Macarthur Rams. She has also captained Newcastle Jets.

She has represented Australia at the 2002 FIFA World Under-19 Women's Championship.

Due to Newcastle Jets' lack of experienced defenders for the 2014 season, Crawford came out of retirement and signed for the Jets.

Career statistics

International goals

Honours

Country
Australia
 OFC Women's Nations Cup: 2003
 OFC U-20 Women's Championship: 2002

References

External links
 FIFA Player Profile

1984 births
Living people
Australian women's soccer players
Canberra United FC players
Newcastle Jets FC (A-League Women) players
A-League Women players
2003 FIFA Women's World Cup players
Australia women's international soccer players
Women's association football midfielders